James Sharples (1751/52–1811) was an English portrait painter and pastelist.

James Sharples may also refer to:

 James Sharples (blacksmith) (1825–1893), English blacksmith and self-taught artist and engraver
 James Sharples (cricketer) (1890–1969), English cricketer who played for Glamorgan
 Sir James Sharples (police officer), chief constable (1989–1998) of Merseyside Police
 James Sharples (bishop) (1797–1850), Coadjutor Vicar Apostolic of the Lancashire District